The Little Colorado River is a tributary of the Colorado River in the U.S. state of Arizona, providing the principal drainage from the Painted Desert region. Although it stretches almost , only the headwaters and the lowermost reaches flow year-round. Between St. Johns and Cameron, most of the river is a wide, braided wash, only containing water after heavy snowmelt or flash flooding.

An overlook of the gorge is a Navajo Nation Tribal Park.

Course
The river rises as two forks in the White Mountains of mid-eastern Arizona, in Apache County. The forks meet in a canyon near the town of Greer, forming the main Little Colorado River. It flows into River Reservoir, then leaves the canyon near Eagar. The river then turns north, meandering through Richville Valley, before emptying into Lyman Lake, impounded by an irrigation dam built in 1912. From there the river continues north, past the town of St. Johns. Shortly afterwards, the river transforms from a perennial stream to an ephemeral wash as it travels northwestwards through Hunt Valley, where it receives the Zuni River, then receiving Silver Creek and the Puerco River—its main tributaries—near the town of Holbrook as it flows into the Painted Desert.

The Little Colorado passes Joseph City and crosses the Southern Transcon route of the BNSF Railway (originally the Atchison, Topeka and Santa Fe Railroad), now winding north into Coconino County. The river enters the Navajo Nation, and drops over the  Grand Falls of the Little Colorado shortly after. Emerging into the desert again, the Little Colorado skirts the eastern edge of Wupatki National Monument and passes the town of Cameron, where it is bridged by U.S. Highway 89.

The depth of the canyon is such that groundwater is forced to the surface, forming numerous springs that restore a perennial river flow. It joins the Colorado deep inside the Grand Canyon, miles from any major settlement. The confluence marks the end of the Marble Canyon segment of the Grand Canyon and the beginning of Upper Granite Gorge.

Discharge

The Little Colorado River is one of the two major tributaries of the Colorado River in Arizona, the other being the Gila River. Runoff typically peaks twice a year, first in the early spring (February–April) from snow melt and highland rain; and in the summer (July–September) from monsoon storms. The annual runoff is extremely variable with the possibility of no flow occurring due to a weak snow pack or lack of summer rain. Conversely, years such as 1949, 1973, 1979, 1983 and 1993 have seen massive volumes of spring snowmelt while large monsoon runoff has occurred in 1955, 1964, 1984 and 2006. Monthly average flows in the springtime average several hundred cfs and can reach . Only the upper reaches of the river above St. Johns, and the lowermost stretch below Cameron, flow year round; the middle section is basically a huge arroyo that carries water only during the wet seasons.

The river's peak flows can be far higher than its average flow, because of quick desert runoff from cloudbursts. At the same gauge, peak flows were recorded from 1923 to 2008, with spotty data from 1924 to 1947.

History

Human activity in the Little Colorado River watershed dates back to the early Holocene epoch, in the last glacial period. Nomadic hunter-gatherers inhabited the relatively water-rich and diverse upper basin of the Little Colorado for almost 8,000 years before the Navajo, Apache and Hopi tribes populated the area. Many of these people practiced small-scale irrigation in riverside villages, located in sheltered canyons and cliffs that provided defense.

Early Spanish explorers exploring the Grand Canyon area were most likely the first Europeans to see the Little Colorado River. They called it Colorado Chiquito, the Little Colorado. Other than fur trappers and mountain men, one of the first organized expeditions into the area of the Little Colorado River was led by Amiel Weeks Whipple in 1853–54 during one of the expeditions to map out a route for a transcontinental railroad. Called The Great Railroad Expeditions, or Pacific Railroad Surveys, Whipple's expedition consisted of several teams going roughly along the 35th parallel from Albuquerque to the Pacific, following the Santa Fe Trail route.

 
The Little Colorado River, also known as the Flax River, and the first Rio Chiquito, is depicted and labelled as such on a map compiled by Lt. Joseph C. Ives and published in the official volumes of those expeditions. Ives would again return to the area in 1858 after navigating a steamboat named the Explorer up the Colorado from south of Yuma northwards to Black Canyon, at which point his party went ashore and attempted to go up into the Grand Canyon until the sheer cliffs prevented them from doing so. Leaving the canyon they proceeded overland and someplace in the vicinity of the Grand Falls (also known as the Chocolate Falls) on the Little Colorado, picked up the Whipple trail from four years prior.

The Powell Geographic Expedition, on August 10, 1869, was one of the first American parties to sight the Little Colorado River. Powell and some of his crew explored a segment of the Little Colorado River canyon, although they mainly found it impassable. In diary entries, they recorded its name as "Flax River", for the flax that makes up much of the river's riparian zone—and "Colorado Chiquito"—so, presumably they already knew about the river before they had come on the expedition.

This was in fact an inaccurate depiction of the Little Colorado, as the muddy flow they observed was the result of a rare flash flood. The river is normally a bright blue color caused by dissolved travertine and limestone in the water, similar to Havasu Creek, another major tributary of the Colorado within the Grand Canyon.

In the 1870s, Mormon colonists migrated southwards from Salt Lake City and settled in the lower part of the Little Colorado River valley. Expeditions had been sent into the basin about five years before to determine the qualities of the area. The Mormons founded Joseph City near the confluence with the Puerco River, and four others nearby, although Joseph City is the only one that still exists. Settlers continued traveling into the area through 1876, although many of them had great difficulty in crossing the Little Colorado. Although shallow and slow-flowing, the river flows through soft sand and in some places, even quicksand, creating non-ideal conditions for their wagons.

It was easier to ford the river at the two waterfalls because at that point, it flows over hard bedrock, making the crossing much easier. The Mormons also made many attempts to construct dams on the river to provide irrigation water—as far upstream as the confluence of the river's forks and as far downstream as below Grand Falls—but most of them failed because of the Little Colorado's fickle variations in discharge. Finally, they managed to construct one at Joseph City that lasted for 29 years. Despite the continued hardships, the Mormons persisted, successfully established their colonies, and survived in the region for many decades. Later, Hispanics began to move into the Little Colorado River watershed from the Rio Grande area, establishing St. Johns and Concho. American ranchers from New Mexico also began to colonize the region, creating Eagar and Springerville. For many years, Mormons were the primary group living in the watershed until the 1960s, when their independent towns and farms were absorbed into the growing Arizonan economy.

River modifications

Because of its isolation, most of the Little Colorado has remained free of human development. However, near its headwaters, the river is dammed twice, first in River Reservoir, then in Lyman Lake, where its water is stored for irrigation. Another reservoir downstream of Springerville, where Mormon colonists dammed the river in 1905 to form Zion Reservoir, is now completely silted in. Many other earthen and masonry dams originally built along the river by the Mormons no longer exist. At very few points is the river confined by levees, with the exception of a  floodwall near Holbrook. There are also few bridges for a river of its length.

In one of the worst radioactive spills in the U.S. history, on July 16, 1979,  of radioactive water containing uranium tailings breached into the North Fork of the Puerco River from a tailing pond of a uranium mine owned by Kerr-McGee Company and United Nuclear Corporation. Traces of the spill can still be found today.

See also

 List of Arizona rivers
 List of tributaries of the Colorado River

References 

Rivers of Arizona
Grand Canyon
Rivers of Apache County, Arizona
Rivers of Navajo County, Arizona
Rivers of Coconino County, Arizona
Geography of the Navajo Nation
Tributaries of the Colorado River in Arizona
Grand Canyon, East Rim